The 1953 Georgia Tech Yellow Jackets football team represented the Georgia Institute of Technology during the 1953 college football season. The Yellow Jackets were led by ninth-year head coach Bobby Dodd and played their home games at Grant Field in Atlanta. They finished second in the Southeastern Conference to Alabama, who had upset then-No. 5 Georgia Tech in Birmingham, giving the Yellow Jackets their first conference loss since 1950. The Yellow Jackets were invited to the 1954 Sugar Bowl, where they defeated West Virginia, 42–19.

Schedule

References

Georgia Tech
Georgia Tech Yellow Jackets football seasons
Sugar Bowl champion seasons
Georgia Tech Yellow Jackets football